The 2019 Ryedale District Council election took place on 2 May 2019 to elect members of the Ryedale District Council in England. It was held on the same day as other local elections.

Results summary

Ward results

Amotherby

Ampleforth

Cropton

Dales

Derwent

Helmsley

Hovingham

Kirkbymoorside

Malton

Norton East

Norton West

Pickering East

Pickering West

Rillington

Ryedale South West

Sherburn

Sheriff Hutton

Sinnington

Thornton Dale

Wolds

By-elections

Cropton

References

2019 English local elections
May 2019 events in the United Kingdom
2019
2010s in North Yorkshire